IABA or Iaba may refer to:

Boxing
 International Amateur Boxing Association
 Irish Athletic Boxing Association

Professional associations
 International Association of Black Actuaries
 Iranian American Bar Association

Other
 Iaba, one of the ancient Assyrian queens Iaba, Banitu and Atalia
 Israel Anti-Boycott Act, a proposed anti-BDS law in the United States